Robert Warnes Leach (December 16, 1914 – March 30, 2008) was an American journalist and Hollywood screenwriter who became a leading figure in California's victims' rights movement after the death of his stepdaughter, Marsalee (Marsy) Nicholas in 1983.

He was the husband of victims' rights advocate Marcella Nicholas Leach and the stepfather of technology entrepreneur and philanthropist Henry Nicholas, co-founder and former co-chairman, president and chief executive officer of Broadcom Corp.

Leach was born December 16, 1914, in Dupree, South Dakota to businessman Robert Henry Leach and his wife, the former Edna Warnes.

Early life and career

He came to Los Angeles as a teenager to see the 1932 Summer Olympics, moving there shortly thereafter to live with his sister, and graduating in 1933 from Los Angeles High School. 
In 1938, after earning a bachelor's degree and a 2nd Lieutenant's commission from the ROTC Field Artillery Reserves at the University of Missouri, he began working for United Press International and eventually became an assistant editor in Los Angeles; he married his first wife, LaVerne Barrick in 1941.

During World War II, he served in the U.S. Navy, mainly in the South Pacific, rising to the rank of lieutenant commander by the time he was released from active duty in 1946.  When he returned to Los Angeles, he met a young sailor who asked if he knew any war stories that might make good screenplays. The sailor turned out to be agent Ray Stark, who then helped Leach get a job as junior writer at 20th Century Fox. Leach spent the next 17 years in Hollywood, first as a production assistant at MGM and later as a TV story editor and screenwriter.  At MGM, he worked as an assistant to producer Lawrence Weingarten; where he was involved with films including Pat and Mike, Adam's Rib and Rhapsody before moving to CBS, where he helped develop story ideas into scripts for TV producer Jack Chertok and wrote freelance teleplays. His TV writing credits include The Adventures of Jim Bowie, Perry Mason, The Case of the Dangerous Robin, Ripcord, Everglades and The Littlest Hobo. In 1958, Leach wrote the feature film Tarzan and the Trappers, starring Gordon Scott. In 1959 and 1960, he also worked as a story editor and writer for the series Men into Space.

During the 1960s, he switched to teaching, becoming an instructor in screenwriting and journalism at Cal State Northridge, Santa Monica College and UCLA. In 1967, three years after the end of his first marriage, he married Marcella M. Nicholas, a divorced mother of two small children who was working on a journalism degree at UCLA. The family settled in Malibu, where Marcella Leach still maintains a home. Leach died March 30, 2008, at South Coast Medical Center in Laguna Beach from complications related to respiratory and kidney ailments. He was 93.

Victims' rights
In 1983, Leach's stepdaughter Marsy Nicholas, then a 21-year-old senior at UC Santa Barbara, was shot to death by her ex-boyfriend. When the killer was released on bail pending trial and Marcella Leach encountered him two weeks after her daughter's funeral at a local market, Leach and his wife were outraged.

Among those who comforted them was Ellen Griffin Dunne, the mother of the murdered actress Dominique Dunne, who had been strangled by an ex-boyfriend. The following year, the Leaches helped Dunne found Justice for Homicide Victims, a non-profit organization dedicated to the support of crime victims and victims' rights.

Bob Leach served for many years as the president of the organization, and both he and Marcella Leach, who remains JHV's executive director, were among the founding board members. His stepson Henry Nicholas also played a crucial role in helping to build JHV.

In 2008, California voters passed Marsy's Law, the nation's most comprehensive victims' bill of rights, named for Marsy Nicholas.

In addition to numerous awards by three governors, the L.A. DA's office and the L.A. Sheriff's Department, Leach and his wife Marcella have been honored by the National office of Victims of Crime and two presidents. In 2005, the Los Angeles County Assn. of Deputy District Attorneys gave Leach its first Robert Leach Award, which recognizes leadership in victims' rights.

References

External links
Justice For Homicide Victims - Justice for Homicide Victims website
Marsy’s Law for All - Marsy's Law for All website

1914 births
2008 deaths
American male journalists
American male screenwriters
People from Ziebach County, South Dakota
University of Missouri alumni
United States Navy officers
United States Navy personnel of World War II
California State University, Northridge faculty
Santa Monica College faculty
University of California, Los Angeles faculty
Journalists from South Dakota
Activists from California
Burials at Rose Hills Memorial Park
Screenwriters from California
Screenwriters from South Dakota
20th-century American male writers
20th-century American screenwriters
20th-century American journalists